The 2001 Tour Down Under was the third edition of the Tour Down Under stage race. It took place from 16 to 21 January in and around Adelaide, South Australia.

Participating teams

Route

Stage results

Final classification

References

External links
Race report

Tour Down Under
Tour Down Under, 2001
Tour Down Under, 2001
2001 in Oceanian sport
Tour